The Super heavyweight competition is the heaviest class featured  at the 2009 World Amateur Boxing Championships, and was held at the Mediolanum Forum. Super heavyweights were limited to those boxers weighing over 91 kilograms (200.6 pounds).

Medalists

Seeds

  Roberto Cammarelle (champion)
  Zhang Zhilei (semifinals)
  David Assene (first round)
  Ivan Dychko (second round)
  Viktar Zuyeu (semifinals)
  Onoriode Ehwarieme (first round)
  Yousef Abed El Ghani  (second round)
  Erislandy Savon Cotilla (quarterfinals)

Draw

Finals

Top Half

Section 1

Section 2

Bottom Half

Section 3

Section 4

See also
Boxing at the 2008 Summer Olympics – Super heavyweight

External links
Draw

Super heavyweight